The Rural Municipality of Orkney No. 244 is a rural municipality (RM) in the Canadian province of Saskatchewan within Census Division No. 9 and  Division No. 4. It is located in the southeast portion of the province.

History 
The RM of Orkney No. 244 incorporated as a rural municipality on January 1, 1913.

Geography

Communities and localities 
The following urban municipalities are surrounded by the RM.

Cities
 Yorkton

Towns
 Springside

Villages
 Ebenezer

The following unincorporated communities are within the RM.

Localities
 Orcadia
 Willowbrook

Demographics 

Government 
The RM of Orkney No. 244 is governed by an elected municipal council and an appointed administrator that meets on the second Thursday of every month. The reeve of the RM is Randy Trost while its administrator is Clint Mauthe. The RM's office is located in Yorkton.

References 

Orkney
Division No. 9, Saskatchewan